Carnival is a 1946 British drama film about a ballet dancer of the Edwardian era, directed by Stanley Haynes and starring Sally Gray, Michael Wilding, Stanley Holloway and Jean Kent. It is based on the 1912 novel of the same name by Compton Mackenzie, which had previous been made into a 1932 film version Dance Pretty Lady by Anthony Asquith. It was shot at Denham Studios with sets designed by the art director Carmen Dillon.

The title of the film is not explained as there is no carnival in the story.

Plot

The story begins at the birth of Jenny. Her father is out at the theatre, watching a clown show - the clown is also his lodger. Three elderly women stand by the bed and lecture Mrs Raeburn on the follies of her daughter joining the stage.

We jump to Jenny on stage, as a ballerina, her father proudly and loudly pointing her out from the balcony, not that the audience wish to hear.

Jenny takes the name of Pearl. She is attractive and easily draws the attention of men. At an art gallery one day, she tries to demonstrate how a sculpture of a dancer is not physically possible and falls over in the process. She is caught by the artist Maurice Avery and they begin a love affair. He asks her to live with him - but not to marry.

At home she still lives with her hard-working mother and fun-loving (and often drunk) father. A new lodger moves into the house, Mr Trewhella. He is told of the ballet and goes to see Jenny on stage. Maurice is already disturbing her career and making her miss rehearsals. Now he plans to take her to Europe on an artistic tour - but he has not told her. Trewhella spies on Jenny and Maurice as they chat after the show. At home he tells Jenny he disapproves of the male audience leering at her. He is a country person and does not like town ways.

On her birthday Maurice takes Jenny dancing to the Covent Garden Ball and gives her a bracelet. He tells her he is going to Spain and asks her to join him. She stays out all night and in the morning changes her mind and tells her parents that she is leaving. But when she goes to Maurice's studio he has already gone. Their mutual friend Fuzz explains and asks her to marry him instead and she runs off.

Her colleagues have little sympathy for her loss. When her mother dies unexpectedly Trewhella asks to marry her and look after both Jenny and Maisie in Cornwall. Reluctantly she accepts and is then known as Mistress Trewhella.

Maurice rematerialises they have a tryst. She asks him to take her to Spain and faints. He carries her off.

Cast
 Sally Gray as Jenny Pearl 
 Michael Wilding as Maurice Avery
 Stanley Holloway as Charlie Raeburn, Jenny's dad
 Bernard Miles as Trewhella
 Jean Kent as Irene Dale
 Catherine Lacey as Florrie Raeburn, Jenny's mum
 Nancy Price as Trewhella's mother
 Hazel Court as Maisie (May) Raeburn, Jenny's sister
 Michael Clarke as Frank (Fuzz) Castleton
 Brenda Bruce as Maudie Chapman
 Anthony Holles as Corentin
 Ronald Ward as Jack Danby
 Mackenzie Ward as Arthur Danby
 Dennis Arundell as Studholme
 Phyllis Monkman as Barmaid
 Amy Feness as Aunt Fanny
 Marie Ault as Mrs. Dale
 Virginia Keiley as Elsie Crawford
 Kathleen Harrison as the Trewhella's maid (uncredited)

Reception
Variety called it "a disjointed, dispirited picture. None of the principal characters, with the possible exception of roles done by Stanley Holloway and Michael Clarke appears credible."

References

External links
 
 Carnival at BFI Film & TV Database
 

1946 films
British black-and-white films
Films based on British novels
Compositions by Charles Williams
Films set in London
Films set in the 1900s
British historical drama films
1940s historical drama films
Two Cities Films films
Films shot at Denham Film Studios
1946 drama films
1940s English-language films
1940s British films